The 1931–32 Elitserien season was the fifth season of the Elitserien, the top level ice hockey league in Sweden. Eight teams participated in the league, and AIK won the league championship.

Final standings

External links
 1931-32 season

Elitserien (1927–1935) seasons
1931–32 in Swedish ice hockey
Sweden